The International Documentary Film Festival Amsterdam (IDFA) is the world's largest documentary film festival held annually since 1988 in Amsterdam. Over a period of twelve days, it has screened more than 300 films and sold more than 250,000 tickets. Visitors to the festival have increased from 65,000 in 2000 to 285,000 in 2018.

The festival is an independent, international meeting place for audiences and professionals to see a diverse (in form, content, and cultural background) program of high-quality documentaries. IDFA selects creative and accessible documentaries, which offer new insights into society. In its mission statement, IDFA says it ‘strives to screen films with urgent social themes that reflect the spirit of the time in which they are made’.

The festival was initially held at the Leidseplein area in the center of Amsterdam. It has since spread to a number of other locations, including Tuschinski Cinema and EYE Filmmuseum. Apart from its international film program, the variety of genres, and the many European and world premieres featured each year, the festival also hosts debates, forums, and workshops. Since 2007, the festival's New Media program IDFA DocLab showcases the best interactive non-fiction storytelling and explores how the digital revolution is reshaping documentary art.

In addition to the festival, IDFA has developed several professional activities, contributing to the development of filmmakers and their films at all stages. At the co-financing and co-production market IDFA Forum filmmakers and producers pitch their plans to financiers; at Docs for Sale new documentaries are on offer to programmers and distributors; the IDFA Bertha Fund supports filmmakers and documentary projects in developing countries, and the IDFAcademy offers international training programs for up-and-coming doc talents.

IDFA was founded by Ally Derks, who remained at the helm from 1988 until 2017 when she stepped down. Barbara Visser oversaw the 2017 edition as interim director. In January 2018, Syrian film producer Orwa Nyrabia was appointed as the new artistic director of IDFA.

Prizes 
The best new documentaries of the year compete in IDFA's main competition programs:

 The IDFA Award for Best Feature-Length Documentary for best documentary longer than 70 minutes.
Prize: €15,000
(The jury also presents a Special Jury Award)
 The IDFA Award for Best Mid-Length Documentary for best documentary between 40 and 70 minutes.
Prize: €10,000
(The jury also presents a Special Jury Award)
 The IDFA Award for Best Short Documentary for best documentary under 40 minutes.
Prize: €5,000
(The jury also presents a Special Jury Award)
 The IDFA Award for Best First Appearance for best debut film.
Prize: €10,000
(The jury also presents a Special Jury Award)
 The IDFA Award for Best Student Documentary for best student documentary from film academies around the world.
Prize: €5,000
(The jury also presents a Special Jury Award)
 The Beeld en Geluid IDFA Award for Dutch Documentary for best Dutch documentary.
Prize: €7,500
(The jury also presents a Special Jury Award)

Alongside the competition programs, five awards are awarded during IDFA:
 VPRO IDFA Audience Award for best film as voted by the audience.
Prize: €5,000
 Amsterdam Human Rights Award for the documentary that best depicts the theme of human rights.
Prize: €25,000
 Prins Bernard Cultuurfonds Documentary Scholarship, a €50,000 grant for a documentary talent, allowing the recipient to make a documentary about a subject of their choice.
 Filmfonds DocLab Interactive Grant, a cash prize for the development of interactive projects within the Netherlands.
 Karen de Bok Talent Award for the winner of the IDFAcademy & NPO-fonds workshop. It is the successor of the Media Fund Award Documentary. The NPO Fund awards the winner €25,000 to further develop the project in collaboration with a producer and a broadcast.

Program sections 
In addition to the competitions, IDFA presents several non-competitive film programs:

Regular programs 
 Masters
In this program section, the festival presents the latest documentaries by renowned documentary auteurs.
 Best of Fests
In Best of Fests, the festival presents films that have made an impact on the international festival circuit this year.
 Panorama
In this section, the festival presents films from all over the world, which are thought-provoking in their form and choice of theme.
 Paradocs
The films in this section showcase what is going on beyond the frame of traditional documentary filmmaking, on the borders between film and art, truth and fiction, and narrative and design.
 Music Documentary
Screenings of many films from this program are accompanied by live performances connected to the films.

Specials 
In addition to the regular programs, each year the festival presents programs like Queer Day, featuring new documentaries about LGBTQ-related topics; Focus programs which zoom in on aspects like sound design, editing , and cinematography or a topical theme; a themed program by DocLab, featuring live events and an interactive exhibition; and a retrospective of a filmmaker who also chooses a personal documentary Top 10.

Award winners

IDFA Award for Best Feature-Length Documentary (formerly: Joris Ivens Award)

VPRO IDFA Audience Award

Special Jury Prize

IDFA Award for Best Mid-Length Documentary (formerly: Silver Wolf Award)

IDFA Award for Best Short Documentary (formerly: Silver Cub Award)

IDFA Award for Best First Appearance

Movies that Matter Human Rights Award

IDFA DOC U! Award for the youth jury's favorite film (formerly: Moviesquad DOC U! Award)

IDFA Award for Best Student Documentary

IDFA DocLab Award for Digital Storytelling

Zapper Award (1994–1996)

References

External links 
 Official site
 Official YouTube channel of the IDFA (contains all the movie trailers)

Culture in Amsterdam
Film festivals in the Netherlands
Documentary film festivals in the Netherlands
Film festivals established in 1988